Kifl Haris is a Palestinian village in the northern West Bank, located six kilometers west of Salfit and 18 kilometers south of Nablus in the Salfit Governorate, northwest of the Israeli settlement city Ariel.

History
Sherds from the Middle Bronze Age, Iron Age II,   Persian,  Hellenistic, Roman,  Byzantine/Umayyad,  Crusader/Ayyubid and  Mamluk eras have been found here.

Ottoman era
In 1517, the village was incorporated into the Ottoman Empire with the rest of Palestine, and in 1596, Kafr Harit appeared in Ottoman tax registers as being in  nahiya (subdistrict) of Jabal Qubal, part of the Sanjak of Nablus.  It had a population of 54 households, all Muslim. They paid taxes on occasional revenues, goats and/or beehives, and a fixed amount; a total of 22,500 akçe.  Sherds from the early Ottoman era have also been found here.

In 1838, Edward Robinson noted it as a village, Kefr Harith,  in the Jurat Merda district, south of Nablus.

In 1870 Victor Guérin reached the village, after walking through "beautiful plantations of figs and olives". He estimated it had 600 inhabitants. The name of this place was given to Guérin as Kefil Haris. The Wely marked on the Palestine Exploration Fund 1880s map as Sheikh Ata, 1 mile north-east of Kefr Haris, is called by him Sheikh Khather. He also calls attention to the remains of an old watchtower built of large, well-cut stones, between Deir Estia and Kefr Haris. At the latter place he found two broken marble columns built up in the wall of the mosque.

In 1882,  PEF's Survey of Western Palestine described  Kifl Haris as a "somewhat small village on high ground, with olive groves to the east. It has three sacred places, Neby Kifl, Neby Nun, and Neby Lusha."

British Mandate of Palestine era
In the 1922 census of Palestine conducted by the British Mandate authorities,  Kufr Hares had a population of 373, all  Muslim, increasing in the 1931 census to 562 persons, still all Muslim, in 130 houses.

In the 1945 statistics the population was 770 Muslims while the total land area was 9,393 dunams, according to an official land and population survey. Of this,  4,117 were allocated for plantations and irrigable land, 2,131 for cereals, while 32 dunams were classified as built-up areas.

Jordanian era
In the wake of the 1948 Arab–Israeli War, and after the 1949 Armistice Agreements, Kifl Haris came  under Jordanian rule.

In 1961, the population was  1,341.

post-1967
Since the Six-Day War in 1967, Kifl Haris has been under  Israeli occupation. Visits by Jewish pilgrims to Kifl Hares are coordinated by the Israeli military.

On 29 May 1989 a large group of Israeli civilians from Joseph's Tomb Yeshiva arrived in Kifl Haris shooting guns randomly. Ibtisan Abdul Rachman Busia, aged 16, was shot dead and two others injured. Two donkeys were killed. Israeli Police detained a number of suspects.

"Tomb of Joshua" and other shrines

Thousands make the pilgrimage to the tombs on the annual commemoration of Joshua's death, 26th of Nisan on the Hebrew calendar.

According to a Samaritan tradition, noted in 1877, the tombs of Joshua and Caleb were in Kifl Haris.

The mausoleum at Kifl Haris seen by Jews as the Tomb of Joshua, is known to Muslims as the Maqam of Yusha' ibn Nun (مقام يوشع بن نون; Shrine of Joshua, son of Nun) and as the Maqam of the Servant of Salah ad-Din (Shrine of the Servant of Saladin). The current structure of the Shrine of Joshua is known to be an Islamic shrine built by Sultan Saladin, which contained on its wall an inscribed plaque stating that "Jawhar bin Abdullah is one of the servants of the shrine." About this man, Palestinian historian Murad Mustafa Dabbagh wrote in his work Biladuna Filastin (Our Country Palestine; 1965) that he performed the pilgrimage on behalf of his master, the martyr Najm al-Din Ayyub, son of Sultan Al-Adil I, and that the Hajj took place in the year 610 AH (1213/14 CE), which places him and the time the shrine was built during the Ayyubid period.

The shrine considered by Jews to be the tomb of Caleb is seen by Muslims to be the maqam of Prophet Dhu al-Kifl, from whom they consider the first part of the town's name to be derived.

The third holy structure in Kifl Haris, standing at some distance in the southwest of the town, is a large open shrine dedicated to Prophet Dhul-Nun, identified with Yunus (Jonah). Jews see in it the tomb of Nun, the father of Joshua.

Wafa Palestine News Agency reports that after the 1967 Six-Day War, the village shrines became a religious destination for Jews, with visits increasingly taking a political and Judaizing character.

Israeli Palestinian conflict 
According to the United Nations OCHA, three local residents were killed during the First Intifada and one during the Second Intifada.

42% of the village land is classified as Area B land, while the remainder 58% is Area C. Israel has confiscated 361 dunams of land from Kifl Haris in order to establish the Israeli settlement of Ariel.

On 14 March 2013, Adele Biton was critically injured (later dying from her injuries), and her mother and two sisters were moderately injured, after their car crashed after Palestinians threw stones their way near the village. Five youths from Kifl Haris were charged by a military court for responsibility for the incident, and as of February 2015 the case has not yet been concluded.

In June 2014, Jamil Ali Abed Jabir died during a night raid by the Israeli army. Locals say he suffered a heart attack while defending his home. According to an Israeli army spokesman, his house wasn't raided.

In 2015, an Israeli tour of the site was preceded by a convoy of military vehicles which closed off the town entrances and imposed a shutdown of all the village shops so Israeli tourists could visit the tomb for several hours.

References

Bibliography

External links
Welcome To Kifl Harith
Kifl Haris, IWPS
Survey of Western Palestine, Map 14:    IAA, Wikimedia commons 
Kifl Haris Town (Fact Sheet),  Applied Research Institute–Jerusalem, ARIJ
Kifl Haris Town Profile,  ARIJ
Kifl Haris Town - aerial photo, ARIJ
Development Priorities and Needs in Kifl Haris, ARIJ

Towns in Salfit Governorate
Salfit Governorate
Jewish pilgrimage sites
Municipalities of West Bank
Municipalities of the State of Palestine